The State Investigation and Protection Agency (SIPA) (Bosnian: Državna agencija za istrage i zaštitu, SIPA) is the official state police agency of Bosnia and Herzegovina. SIPA is under the direct administration of the Ministry of Security of Bosnia and Herzegovina. Essentially, it is Bosnia and Herzegovina's equivalent to the American FBI or the Russian Investigative Committee.

History 
After the war in Bosnia and Herzegovina and the Dayton Agreement, first organisation with very limited law enforcement authorities was Agency for Information and Protection of Bosnia and Herzegovina (Agencija za informacije i zaštitu Bosne i Hercegovine), established in 2002. These independent Agency had tasks to collecting data of interest related with international crimes and criminal legislation of Bosnia and Herzegovina, and protection of VIP as well as diplomatic and consular missions of Bosnia and Herzegovina. In June 2004 current day's SIPA was created, by transformation of Agency for Information and Protection of BiH, under the Ministry of Security, but independent in operational matters.

In accordance with the Law on State Investigation and Protection Agency and in accordance with other regulations, SIPA performs tasks within its jurisdiction throughout the state of Bosnia and Herzegovina. It is also the basic tool of stability and the tool for making the people of Bosnia and Herzegovina feel safe and secure from threats within the state.

The activities of SIPA include the arrests of persons that are suspected of committing war crimes, as well as successful investigations of money-laundering activities, combating organized crime and terrorism, provision of witnesses with protection and support, and the formation and development of a special unit.

Organization 
SIPA started off with just three employees, whereas today it has over 850 employees working in 11 organizational units at the headquarters of the agency and in 4 regional offices within the cities of  Sarajevo, Tuzla, Banja Luka, and Mostar. Through the activities they carry out, the employees of the Agency provide hope in the better and safer future for all the citizens of BiH.

Equipment
SIPA Units are equipped like most counter-terrorist units around the world; with a vast array of specialized firearms including the Yugoslavian-made Zastava M70, as well as other variants in 7.62 mm such as the AK74 and AK74U, as well as 5.56 mm caliber assault rifles such as the M4A1 carbine.

There are also other weapons in different calibers such as the Heckler & Koch MP5, H&K G3, G36, various sniper rifles, pistols such as the CZ 99 and Glock 17, and non-lethal weapons such as riot control agents, stun grenades, and miscellaneous equipment including heavy body armor, entry tools, and night vision optics.

SIPA currently commandeers both military and civilian grade vehicles, such as Hummers, BRDM-2s, Iveco LMVs, Toyota Land Cruisers, VW Golfs, VW Transporters and Mercedes-Benz G-270s.

For operations involving aerial insertion, the main mode of transport are three Jet Rangers, two Bell 212s, one Mil Mi-8, four SOKO Gazelle Gamas, and one UH-1H.

Small arms

Vehicles

Aircraft

SIPA can use helicopters used by the Armed Forces.

International stance 
Because they recognized the importance of the agency, many ambassadors and representatives from international organizations visited SIPA. Some Embassies even donated equipment and other material and technical support. SIPA cooperates, on regular basis, with EUPM and ICITAP, the result of which are the tasks performed in accordance with international standards and also the staff trained at some of the most renowned police institutions throughout the world.

Mission 
 SIPA is a government agency within the Ministry of Security of B&H. It has operational independence; it was founded for the purpose of doing police work. The head of SIPA is its Director.
 SIPA works on the basis of professionalism, without representing, protecting or undermining the interests of any political party, or any registered organization or society, any constituent peoples, or any other peoples in B&H.
 After adopting the following set of laws in 2004, out of the Agency for Information and Protection SIPA turned into a police body:
 Law on State Investigation and Protection Agency,
 Law on Police Employees,
 Law on Prevention of Money Laundering,
 Law on the Protection of Threatened and Endangered Witnesses,
 Law on Witness Protection Program in B&H, etc.

Within the area of its legally determined jurisdiction, SIPA deals with prevention, detection and investigations of organized crime, terrorism and illegal trade—ABHO, war crimes and acts punishable according to the international war and humanitarian law, people trafficking, as well as all other crimes within the jurisdiction of the Court of B&H.

SIPA provides help for the Court and the Office of the Prosecutor of B&H, it deals with physical and technical protection of people, of buildings and other property protected under the Law on SIPA; it also deals with witness protection, prevention of money laundering as well as other tasks determined by law and by other regulations.

Future priorities 
 the fight against organized crime   
 investigations of terrorism and terrorist activities
 money laundering and financing of terrorist activities
 investigations of war crimes and arrests of the persons suspected of committing war crimes

References

External links 
 Official SIPA website

Law enforcement agencies of Bosnia and Herzegovina
Domestic intelligence agencies
2005 establishments in Bosnia and Herzegovina
Government agencies established in 2005